Yuanben was an early form of Chinese opera which thrived in northern China during the Jin dynasty (1115–1234) and early Yuan dynasty (1271–1368). Unlike the contemporary nanxi, which flourished in East China, no yuanben play has survived. Nevertheless, 691 yuanben titles are listed in a 1366 book by Tao Zongyi. Yuanben might have been very similar to the zaju in the Song dynasty which controlled southern China, and it eventually evolved into the zaju of the Yuan dynasty.

Role types
There were five role types in yuanben, namely:
Fujing, derived from the canjun role type in canjunxi, a clown
Fumo, derived from the canghu role type in canjunxi, a jester
Yinxi, a playleader
Moni, an actor-director
Guzhuang, the "mandarin" role

References

Jin dynasty (1115–1234)
Chinese opera